Gorgan Airport  is an international airport located in the city of Gorgan, Iran.

The airport is located 2 km west of the Gorgan-Aq Qala Highway and 6 km north of Gorgan, the capital of Golestan province.

Airlines and destinations

Development and expansion
The airport terminal expansion is currently underway: the new wing will be reserved for international flights and will extend for 10,550 sq.
Äccidents and incidents 

on 17 May 2001 a short-haul trijet Yakovlev Yak-40 being operated by Faraz Qeshm Airlines crashed while en route to Gorgan Airport from Tehran-Mehrabad Airport in Iran. The aircraft crashed in mountainous terrain while flying in poor weather conditions about twenty kilometers south of Sari killing all thirty people on board.Faraz Qeshm Airlines Yak-40 crash

References

Airports in Iran
Buildings and structures in Golestan Province
Transportation in Golestan Province